Jack Beaumont (born 21 November 1993) is a retired British rower. He is the silver medallist at the 2020 Summer Olympics in Men's quadruple sculls. He also won a silver medal at the World Championships.

Career
Jack is the son of Olympic rower Peter Beaumont.

Beaumont started competing as part of the GB Rowing Team at the 2010 World Junior Championships in Racice, where they finished fourth. In 2014, Beaumont was a World U23 bronze medallist in men's double scull.

Beaumont was involved in an accident in 2015, which fractured several vertebrae. He missed being selected for the 2016 Summer Olympics, but days before the Games started, he was chosen to replace Graeme Thomas who had fallen ill.  He competed in the men's quadruple sculls event, and finished in fifth place. 

In 2017, he won a silver medal at the World Rowing Championships in Sarasota, Florida, as part of the quadruple sculls with Jonathan Walton, John Collins and Graeme Thomas. 

At the 2020 Summer Olympics held in 2021 in Tokyo, Groom won a silver together with Harry Leask, Tom Barras and Angus Groom in the Men's quadruple sculls. Beaumont retired from international rowing after the Olympic Games.

References

External links
 

1993 births
Living people
British male rowers
Place of birth missing (living people)
World Rowing Championships medalists for Great Britain
Olympic rowers of Great Britain
Rowers at the 2016 Summer Olympics
Rowers at the 2020 Summer Olympics
Medalists at the 2020 Summer Olympics
Olympic silver medallists for Great Britain
Olympic medalists in rowing